Austerlitz is a village in the Dutch province of Utrecht. It is a part of the municipality of Zeist, and lies about 6 km east of Zeist.

History 
In 1804, an army camp was established at the site, called French camp. The town was founded on 17 August 1806 on the location of the camp. It was given its name by King Louis Napoleon of Holland in honour of the victory of his brother, emperor Napoleon in the Battle of Austerlitz. In 1840, it was home to 233 people.

Close to the town, there is an artificial hill called the Pyramid of Austerlitz, actually part of the municipality Woudenberg. It used to have a wooden obelisk, but was removed in 1808 due to instability. In 1894, a stone obelisk added to the top.

Gallery

References 

Populated places in Utrecht (province)
Zeist
1806 establishments in the Netherlands